Peptidyl-Lys metalloendopeptidase (Armillaria mellea neutral proteinase, peptidyllysine metalloproteinase) is an enzyme. This enzyme catalyses the following chemical reaction

 Preferential cleavage in proteins: -Xaa-Lys- (in which Xaa may be Pro)

This enzyme is isolated from the honey fungus Armillaria mellea.

References

External links 
 

EC 3.4.24